Tuhua may refer to:

 Shaozhou Tuhua, an unclassified Chinese language of Guangdong and Guangxi provinces
 Xiangnan Tuhua, an unclassified Chinese language of southeastern Hunan
 Mayor Island / Tuhua, a volcano in New Zealand
 Tuhua railway station, a station on the Stratford–Okahukura Line in New Zealand